Race Forward is a nonprofit racial justice organization with offices in Oakland, California, and New York City. Race Forward focuses on catalyzing movement building for racial justice. In partnership with communities, organizations, and sectors, the organization build strategies to advance racial justice in policies, institutions, and culture.

History 
Race Forward was founded by Gary Delgado in 1981, and was known as the Applied Research Center until 2013. Delgado remained in leadership until 2006, after which point Rinku Sen became Executive Director. In 2017, Race Forward merged with the Center for Social Inclusion and is now under the leadership of Glenn Harris, former President of the Center for Social Inclusion. Rinku Sen remained with the organization as Senior Strategist.

Activities 
Race Forward advances racial justice through research, media, and leadership development. The work of Race Forward focuses on finding ways to re-articulate racism to draw attention to systemic racism. Their work is based on an intersectional understanding of race and the impact of racism alongside other social issues.

Race Forward emphasizes three principles: using specific and plain talk to say what you mean about race issues; focusing on impact rather than intention; and using strategic terms as well as moral arguments. The organization has published research reports and editorials on issues such as millennials and their attitudes towards race, environmental issues and grassroots organizing, race and religion, and police accountability. Race Forward uses research on community demographics and shifting populations of Black communities to understand and support community organizing efforts.

Race Forward has endorsed the Movement for Black Lives.

Race Forward organizes Racial Justice Training series - a collection of interactive sessions for those who wish to sharpen their skills and strategies to address structural racism and advance racial equity.

Publications 
Publications from Race Forward include:

Beyond the Politics of Place: New Directions in Community Organizing in the 1990s (1994)

Deliberate Disadvantage: A Case Study of Race Relations in the San Francisco Bay Area (1996)

Education and Race (1998)

Crisis: How California Teaching Policies Aggravate Racial Inequality in Public Schools (1999)

Facing the consequences: An examination of racial discrimination in U.S. public schools (2000)

Racial profiling and punishment in U.S. public schools: How zero tolerance policies and high stakes testing subvert academic excellence and racial equity (2001)

"Cruel and Usual: How Welfare 'Reform' Punishes Poor People (2001)

Welfare Reality (2001)

Mapping the Immigrant Infrastructure (2002)

Profiled and punished: How San Diego schools undermine Latino and African American student achievement (2002)

Multiracial Formations (2003)

Race and Recession (May 2009)

Don’t call them “Post-Racial”: Millennials’’ attitudes on race, racism, and key systems in our society. (2011)

Shattered families: The perilous intersection of immigration enforcement and the child welfare system (2011)

Racial Equity Impact Assessment Toolkit

Race Forward publishes the daily news site Colorlines, published by Executive Director Rinku Sen. Colorlines was initial a magazine, and it transformed into a website in 2010.

In 2015, Race Forward launched an interactive multimedia tool called "Clocking-In," designed to highlight race and gender inequality in service industries.

Conference 
Race Forward presented Facing Race: A National Conference. Facing Race is the largest national biennial gathering of racial justice advocates, journalists, community organizers, artists, and more. The November 2016 conference in Atlanta featured speakers including Isa Noyola, Alicia Garza, Jose Antonio Vargas, and Michelle Alexander, and included discussion about strategic responses to the election of President Donald Trump, with a focus on solutions and opportunities to grow existing racial justice agendas.  In 2018, the conference in Detroit featured keynote speaker Tarana Burke, founder of the #MeToo movement.

References

Organizations established in 1981
Organizations based in New York City
Organizations based in Oakland, California
Nonprofit institutes based in the United States